Hypericum crux-andreae, commonly called St. Peter's-wort, is a small shrubby flowering plant in the St. John's wort family Hypericaceae. It is native to Eastern North America, where it is primarily found in the sandy soils of the Coastal Plain with extensions into the Piedmont and Cumberland Plateau.

It is found in wet flatwoods, and generally in wet, open, sandy areas such as bogs or seeps, although it is occasionally found in drier habitats.

References

Endemic flora of the United States
crux-andreae
Plants described in 1753
Taxa named by Carl Linnaeus
Flora without expected TNC conservation status